Bogdanovskoye is a rural locality (a village) in Austrumsky Selsoviet, Iglinsky District, Bashkortostan, Russia. The population was 28 as of 2010. There is 1 street.

Geography 
Bogdanovskoye is located 40 km east of Iglino (the district's administrative centre) by road. Simskoye is the nearest rural locality.

References 

Rural localities in Iglinsky District